The SPEAK FREE Act of 2015 is a bipartisan Act of Congress that was introduced on May 13, 2015, designed to serve as federal anti-SLAPP legislation, to protect free speech in practice. Its title is an acronym (S.P.E.A.K. F.R.E.E.) that stands for "Securing Participation, Engagement, and Knowledge Freedom by Reducing Egregious Efforts Act of 2015".

Details 

The Bill was designed to prevent SLAPP lawsuits (strategic lawsuit against public participation), which are often brought to silence critics. SLAPP suits are used as legal retaliation, by burdening them with the costs of a legal defense, until they abandon their criticism.

Background 

In response to several notable SLAPP abuses in recent times, United States Representative Blake Farenthold (R-TX), along with 20 Democrat and 11 Republican co-sponsors, introduced the SPEAK FREE Act to dismiss lawsuits which are used to harass plaintiffs. The SPEAK FREE Act was formed by observing what has been shown to work, after being previously implemented in over twenty States where anti-SLAPP legislation had already been tested.

With the looming prospect that Donald Trump might become President, Congress decided to address the SPEAK FREE Act, with the Bill's sponsor, Rep. Farenthold (R), stating, "Obama will sign this. I don’t think Trump will."

Judiciary hearing 

On June 22, 2016, the House Judiciary Committee held a hearing on the Bill. Witnesses who gave testimony included Aaron Schur (Senior Director of Litigation of Yelp), Bruce Brown (Reporters Committee for Freedom of the Press), Alexander A. Reinert (Professor of Law at Cardozo), and Laura Prather (partner of Haynes and Boone, LLP).

Response 

The Bill was praised for its bipartisan support in protecting free speech by the Public Participation Project, the Electronic Frontier Foundation, and Yelp, among others, as the Bill is also geared toward protecting online criticism.

See also 

 Censorship
 Legal burden of proof
 Strategic lawsuit against public participation

External links 

 Anti-SLAPP.org
 California Anti-Slapp Project (CASP)
 H.R.2304 - SPEAK FREE Act of 2015
 Open Letter Support for the SPEAK FREE Act

References 

Proposed legislation of the 114th United States Congress
Censorship
Freedom of expression
Freedom of the press
Political repression in the United States